KMVA (97.5 FM) is a Rhythmic Hot AC radio station in the Phoenix, Arizona, area. The station is licensed to Dewey-Humboldt and is owned by Riviera Broadcasting, LLC. KMVA forms a full-time simulcast with KZON in Gilbert in order to cover the entire Phoenix metropolitan area.

History

In Flagstaff
In 1985, Santa Rosa Broadcasting obtained the construction permit for 97.5 in Flagstaff, as KENR, which came to air late in 1986 as a soft adult contemporary station. The station was acquired by KVNA and relaunched on January 15, 1988, as KVNA-FM, moving to a more regular adult contemporary sound. By 1992, it had shifted to contemporary hit radio, branded as "The Heat"; when the Park Lane Group bought KVNA-AM-FM in 1995, the station flipped from adult alternative to adult contemporary "Sunny 97"; while some listeners lamented the change, Park Lane cited the lack of an AC station in the market for the move.

Move into Phoenix

Marathon Media, a company known for taking rural stations and moving them closer to larger metropolitan areas in order to sell them for a larger amount, purchased the station in 2003, and got approval to move the station to a site between Phoenix and Prescott to cover the Phoenix metropolitan area. On January 1, 2005, in order to remain in Flagstaff, the "Sunny" format moved to 100.1 FM, which changed its call letters from KLOD to become the new KVNA-FM.

The new 97.5 facility first signed on in April 2005 as KZLB, calling itself "97.5 Latino Beat," featuring a mix of Spanish-language pop and Reggaeton. The station was in the middle of being sold at the time. KVIB 95.1, a station broadcasting from the same location with an identical format, signed on the air just one month later, thus forcing KZLB off the air for three months. 97.5 returned to the airwaves in late August with a format that consisted of a mix of classic and more recently recorded Pop Standards and Swing music, known on-air as "Star 97.5" with the KRZS calls. KRZS flipped to Rhythmic AC as "Movin' 97.5" at 5PM on October 27, 2006. The last song on Star 97.5 was "You Make Me Feel So Young" by Frank Sinatra, while the first song on Movin' 97.5 was "Bust a Move" by Young MC. The station's old website was still up, but left a goodbye message to its listeners as to why they made the decision to switch formats and hopes that they could find a new place for its displaced one.  Throughout 2009, the station began adding various top 40 pop and rock songs, moving more into a Hot AC direction but keeping some of the rhythmic material.  During this period, the station aired On Air With Ryan Seacrest.

On November 24, 2010, KMVA temporarily dropped its Top 40 format and began stunting with all-Christmas music. In addition, all references to "MOViN'" were omitted, an indication that KMVA will flip to a new format after the Holidays. On December 20, 2010, Trumper revealed that at midnight on December 25, 2010, KMVA would officially become Hot 97.5, a contemporary hit radio with a unique mix of Top 40 and Hot AC currents. The first three songs on "Hot" were "Raise Your Glass" by P!nk, "September" by Daughtry, and "Viva La Vida" by Coldplay. Both Elvis Duran and Ryan Seacrest's shows were retained at KMVA after the transition.  The station was added again to Mediabase's contemporary hit radio panel as of July 2011.

Hot 97.5/103.9

In early 2012, KMVA shifted its direction towards a Dance presentation and became more music intensive with the addition of more Dance hits, along with a new slogan "The Hits and Dance Channel" to reflect the adjusted changes. It also dropped Elvis Duran for a music-driven morning show that same year. By 2013, the Dance product was phased out for more Hot AC product, but remained within the Top 40/CHR realm. However, by the Fall of 2013, KMVA returned to an Adult Top 40 direction altogether. On December 27, 2013, Trumper Communications and Riviera Broadcasting Group announced that they would merge their Adult Top 40 outlets into one simulcast, with KMVA and KEXX becoming "Hot 97.5/103.9 Trending Radio." The combined signals made their launch on December 31, 2013. On March 14, 2014, the sale of KMVA by Trumper Communications to Riviera Broadcasting was consummated at a price of $11,270,000.

On June 17, 2022, at noon, KMVA and KZON shifted to rhythmic hot AC, keeping the "Hot" branding and adopting the "Rhythm of the Valley" positioner, with the first song being "Hot in Herre" by Nelly.

References

External links
HOT 97.5/103.9

MVA
Rhythmic contemporary radio stations in the United States